Stavropoulos, feminine Stavropoulou is a Greek surname which – in its Latinized form – can also be found in the Greek diaspora. It is a patronymic derived from the personal name Stavros by adding the patronymic ending -poulos (from Latin pullus meaning "nestling", "chick").
Notable people with this name include:

 Dimitrios Stavropoulos, Greek footballer
 George Stavropoulos (1920–1990), American fashion designer 
 Ilias Stavropoulos (born 1995), Greek football right winger
 Nikos Stavropoulos (born 1959), Greek professional basketball player

References 

Greek-language surnames